Kari Voutilainen (born in 1962) is a Finnish watchmaker residing in Môtiers, Switzerland. He started an independent watchmaking business in 2002, building a limited number of handmade timekeepers. In 2005, he introduced the world's first decimal repeater sounding hours, ten-minute intervals and then minutes.
Voutilainen is Member of the AHCI and created together with Andreas Strehler the watch "Chapter III" for Maîtres du Temps in 2012. Altogether eight watches by Voutilainen have been awarded The Grand Prix d'Horlogerie de Genève (Geneva Watchmaking Grand Prix).

In 2021 Voutilainen together with a group of investors acquired watchmaking company Urban Jürgensen and was appointed as the CEO of the company.

Notes

External links
 

Finnish watchmakers (people)
20th-century Finnish businesspeople
 Finnish expatriates in Switzerland
1962 births
Living people
21st-century Finnish businesspeople
People from Rovaniemi